Ludwig Nohl (born 5 December 1831 in Iserlohn; died 15 December 1885 in Heidelberg) was a German music scholar and writer best known for discovering and publishing Beethoven's famous bagatelle, "Für Elise".

Life
After graduation from the Gymnasium in Duisburg, Nohl studied jurisprudence at the universities in Bonn, Heidelberg, and Berlin, where he received instruction in music from Siegfried Dehn and Friedrich Kiel. From 1853 to 1856 he was a referendary and undertook journeys to France and Italy, and he also taught music in Heidelberg. In 1860 he wrote his thesis on Mozart and earned the rank of privatdozent for "History and Aesthetic of Musical Art."

In 1864 he moved to Munich and made an introduction to Richard Wagner, whose works he had praised in his writings. In 1865 he was awarded by King Ludwig II the title of Professor of Music at the University of Munich for his compilation of Mozart's letters. The university faculty, however, was disinclined to Nohl, and he was not given any teaching duties. In that year he discovered through the "industrial teacher" Babeth Bredl in Munich the now-lost autograph of Beethoven's Bagatelle Für Elise. The work was first published in 1867 in Nohl's book "New Beethoven Letters" (Neue Briefe Beethovens).

From 1868 to 1872 he lived in Badenweiler and eventually returned to Heidelberg. In 1875, he was a Dozent at the polytechnic in Karlsruhe (predecessor to the Karlsruhe Institute of Technology) and became a full professor in 1880.

He was one of the most widely read writers on music of his time. His many books went through many printings. His main legacy is as a Beethoven scholar, and a portion of his writings are housed at the state archive in Iserlohn.

External links
 
 

1831 births
1885 deaths
19th-century German composers
19th-century German musicians
Beethoven scholars
German writers about music
19th-century musicologists